KAKQ-FM is a commercial hot adult contemporary music radio station in Fairbanks, Alaska, broadcasting on 101.1 FM.

History
The station signed on the air as KAYY in 1981 as Fairbanks' first commercial FM radio station. The call letters for KAKQ were previously used by an AM radio in the same area that broadcast between 1987 and 1995.

References

External links
Magic 101.1's Website

1981 establishments in Alaska
Hot adult contemporary radio stations in the United States
Radio stations established in 1981
AKQ-FM
IHeartMedia radio stations